Taqdeer is a 1983 Indian Hindi-language film directed by Brij Sadanah, starring Shatrughan Sinha, Hema Malini, Mithun Chakraborty, Zeenat Aman in lead roles.

Cast
Shatrughan Sinha as Shiva
Hema Malini as Chandni
Mithun Chakraborty as Vikram Singh
Zeenat Aman as Nisha
Ranjeet as Ranveer Singh
Raza Murad as Abdul
Ramesh Deo as Randhir Singh
Seema Deo as Seema Singh

Box office
The film enjoyed success overseas in the Soviet Union, where it was released in 1985, because of Mithun's fan base there. The film sold  tickets in the Soviet Union.

Music
Lyrics were written by Indeevar and Music was by Kalyanji-Anandji

References

External links
 
http://ibosnetwork.com/asp/filmbodetails.asp?id=Taqdeer+%281983%29

1983 films
1980s Hindi-language films
Indian action films
Films scored by Kalyanji Anandji
1983 action films
Hindi-language action films
Films directed by Brij Sadanah